Lansberg is a lunar impact crater on the Mare Insularum. It can be located by following a line south-southwest from Copernicus to Reinhold, then southwest to Lansberg. The crater has a high rim and a central mountain. There are terraces along the inner walls, and the tops have slumped to produce a sharp edge. This formation is not noticeably eroded, and there are no significant impact craters within the interior.

The crater is correctly spelled "Lansberg", but has sometimes been written "Landsberg" instead. It is named for the Belgian/Dutch astronomer Philippe van Lansberge.

Approximately 40 km to the southeast of Lansberg is the landing site of the Luna 5 probe, and a further 60 km in the same direction is the landing site of Surveyor 3 and Apollo 12.

Satellite craters
By convention these features are identified on lunar maps by placing the letter on the side of the crater midpoint that is closest to Lansberg.

References

External links
 Oblique view of Lansberg at high sun angle from Apollo 12: AS12-51-7538

Impact craters on the Moon